Dadarao Keche is an Indian politician. He serves as Member of 14th Maharashtra Legislative Assembly from Arvi Assembly constituency. In the 2019 Maharashtra Legislative Assembly election, he beat Kale Amar Sharadrao with the margin of 12,467 votes. In April 2020, he broke the COVID-19 lockdown rules in India by celebrating his birthday with 200 people for which a First information report registered against him.

References 

Living people
Indian politicians
Maharashtra Legislature
Year of birth missing (living people)